Cultura: International Journal of Philosophy of Culture and Axiology is a biannual peer-reviewed academic journal that was established in 2004 and covers philosophical work exploring different values and cultural phenomena. The journal is published in print format by Peter Lang. Online access to all issues of Cultura from 2005 to the present is provided by the Philosophy Documentation Center.

Abstracting and indexing 
Cultura is abstracted and indexed in Arts and Humanities Citation Index, Humanities International Complete, Humanities International Index, International Bibliography of Periodical Literature, International Bibliography of the Social Sciences, MLA International Bibliography, Naviga, Primo Central Index, The Philosopher's Index, PhilPapers, Philosophy Research Index, Scopus, and TOC Premier.

See also 
 Axiology
 List of philosophy journals

References

External links 
 
 Free access to 2011 issues

Aesthetics journals
Axiology
Cultural journals
Social philosophy journals
Publications established in 2004
Biannual journals
Peter Lang academic journals
Multilingual journals